Cape Burd is a low rock cliff forming the southwest extremity of the Tabarin Peninsula, at the northeast end of the Antarctic Peninsula. It was charted by the Falkland Islands Dependencies Survey (FIDS) in 1946 and named for Oliver Burd, a FIDS meteorologist who lost his life when the base hut at Hope Bay burned on November 9, 1948. Neighbouring Cape Green commemorates Michael Green, a FIDS geologist who lost his life in the same fire.

References
 

Headlands of Trinity Peninsula